The Fairlawn Centre (formerly Fairlawn Plaza) is a strip mall along Carling Avenue in Ottawa, Ontario, Canada. The mall opened in 1961 when the plaza's original tenants were Steinberg's grocery store and J. Pascal Hardware. Miracle Mart was also one of the early tenants.

Canadian Tire was a tenant from December 1974 until it closed in March 2008 and moved to a bigger location 2 kilometres east on Carling Avenue. The Royal Bank of Canada also had a branch at the plaza. Fairlawn Diner, a dry cleaners, and a beauty salon and barbers shop which all closed during renovations in 2009–10. Business had been severely affected when Canadian Tire closed.

The expansion of Carlingwood Mall directly across Carling Avenue, which itself had many of the same types of retail stores as Fairlawn Plaza, may be one reason for the mall's dwindling customer base.

The site was partially redeveloped in the early 2010s. The expanded Fairlawn Centre now includes Harvey's, Swiss Chalet, H&R Block and Bridgehead Coffee.

References

Shopping malls in Ottawa
Shopping malls established in 1961
Strip malls